Gods and Ends is the debut novel by writer Lindsay Pereira. It was published by Penguin Random House India in March 2021. Set in Orlem, Malad, a suburb of Mumbai populated by a large Roman Catholic community. It is described as a book about invisible people in a city of millions, and the claustrophobia they rarely manage to escape from. The title is a reference to people who are twice marginalized—for being a minority community and living in a small, lesser-known part of a large suburb.

Reception 
The novel was described by The Hindu as "a stark and fearless portrayal of the Roman Catholic community in the Bombay of yore." The publication Firstpost described it as "stark in its simplicity," adding that the writer "uses dialogue and narration with good effect, giving each character enough space to tell their story." The newspaper Mid Day said "Pereira’s chronicling subtly encapsulates their eccentricities, including the diction and acerbic humour, all of which will resonate with not just Bombaywallahs."

Platform Magazine wrote: "The tragedy of this book and its characters is real, and the narrative manages to create necessary space for the lives and stories of people, who are generally erased from our imagination of the limitless city of Bombay." Janhavi Acaharekar, reviewing the book, wrote: "Pereira’s well-crafted characters are born of a familiarity with the milieu he writes about, and his honesty is brutal." A review in the Mint Lounge called it "an acerbic, funny and, at times, brutally honest portrayal of Goan Catholics settled in the suburb of Orlem."

Awards 
Gods and Ends was short-listed for the 2021 JCB Prize for Literature. A citation from the judges said: "With a biting sense of humour and a quirky voice, Lindsay Pereira puts forth an intriguing debut. Part of the attraction lies in its unconventional form and structure. Each of the residents of Obrigado mansion seem to be competing in being more malevolent and pathetic than the other, making each of them particularly foul, but Pereira doesn’t offer any excuses for them, making them all unforgettable."

The novel was also shortlisted for the Tata Literature Live! First Book Award for Fiction in November, 2021. It was also longlisted for the PFC-Valley of Words Book Awards 2022.

The author
Born in Orlem, Malad, Lindsay Pereira grew up in Bombay. He studied at St. Xavier's College and the University of Mumbai and obtained a PhD in literature for his work on gender attitudes implicit in nineteenth-century Indian fiction. He has worked as a journalist and writer for publications including The Huffington Post, The Globe and Mail, and New York Observer and has been a columnist with the daily Mid-Day since 2015.

He was also co-editor with the late poet Eunice de Souza of Women's Voices: Selections from Nineteenth and Early-Twentieth Century Indian Writing in English, published by Oxford University Press.

References 

Novels set in Mumbai
Novels set in Maharashtra
2021 debut novels
Penguin Books India books